The United States Air Force Academy Airfield  is an airfield located near Colorado Springs, Colorado, and in use by the United States Air Force Academy.

References

United States Air Force